The Gwinnett School of Mathematics, Science, and Technology (GSMST) is a special public school in Lawrenceville, Georgia, United States, and a part of Gwinnett County Public Schools. Students are admitted through a county-wide lottery, whose participants, since the school dropped its charter status in 2016, must meet multiple requirements. It features a heavy focus on project-based STEM education. Its rigorous course offerings and high student graduation rate make it one of the most prestigious high schools in the state.

GSMST is notable for its focus on technology. Through contracts with Lenovo and HP Inc., every student is issued a laptop with pre-installed software such as AutoCAD, Adobe Photoshop, and Adobe Premiere Pro. Teachers and students have access to school-wide SMART boards and overhead LCD projectors.

History 
The school was chartered in March 2006 by the Gwinnett County Board of Education through SPLOST and opened in the fall of 2007. It was temporarily housed on the Duluth High School campus, but building 100 began in 2007 as a separate school from Duluth High School. Renovations updated and modernized 18 classrooms and offices, and GSMST moved to its permanent location in 2010 at the geographic center of Gwinnett County, near Sugarloaf Parkway and Old Norcross Road, the former site of Benefield Elementary School. The new building is designed for a maximum of 1,200 students. The school is adjacent to the Maxwell High School of Technology.

In 2016, GSMST was awarded the Blue Ribbon Award.

Courses 
The school offers high-level courses that challenge students, including numerous Advanced Placement courses. Freshman coursework includes Honors and Gifted Chemistry, Honors and Gifted Physics, Accelerated Integrated Algebra, Accelerated Integrated Geometry, Accelerated Integrated Precalculus, Honors and Gifted Language Arts, Fundamentals of Engineering I, Foreign Language (Chinese I, German I, Spanish I, and Spanish II), and one elective class. Some of these courses are taught on a block schedule, allowing students to earn up to nine Carnegie units in ninth grade. The main focus of the school is mathematics, science, and technology, but other subjects are also taught at the highest levels available. Each course is designed to integrate content from other courses into its own lessons to demonstrate the history and practical applications of each course. Notably, there are no Title 1 Sports at GSMST.

Extracurricular Groups and Clubs 
 
 Academic World Quest
 Art and Design Club
 Chinese Club
 Computer Science Club
 Debate 
 Digital Media Club (DMC)
 Environmental Club (ECOS)
 German Club

 Gwinnett Student Leadership Team (GSLT)
 Infinitas Literary Magazine
 Math Team
 Medfinity
 Model United Nations (MUN)
 Readers Rally
 Relay for Life
 Robotics
 
 Scholar's Bowl Team
 Science Bowl
 Science Olympiad
 Spanish Club
 Student Council
 Technology Student Association (TSA) 
Updated August 27th, 2021

Academic World Quest 
GSMST Team "A" placed first in the Georgia Academic World Quest Competition and placed in the top 10 out of 39 teams in the national competition in Washington D.C.

Chinese Club 
GSMST Chinese Club explores Chinese culture through activities such as crafts and food. Members can also participate a variety of games on "Game Days" such as ping pong, Mahjong, and Chinese Checkers. Food meetings are popular as members can create their own portions. Everything from scallion pancakes to tangyuan can be made throughout the academic year. GSMST Chinese Club bubble tea sales are also popular as many students outside Chinese Club can enjoy the many different tea flavors offered. The profit from these sales goes to organizations and charities in Taiwan and China.

Debate Team 
 The following is a list of awards received by members of the debate team.

GSMST News 
GSMST News is a morning show which is created and managed by the GSMST Digital Media Club. The show announces upcoming events and notices and contains occasional messages from the principal and other administrators.

Math Team 
GSMST placed first in the sophomore division, second in the junior division, third in the freshman division, and second overall in the GAME competition.

Five GSMST students made it to the semi-final round of the Georgia Tech Math Competition.

Model United Nations 
GSMST won the overall conference award for Best Foreign Policy at the Southern US Model UN conference at Emory University. Three GSMST students received individual recognition as Best Delegates for their individual committees.

GSMST students won 12 of 28 possible awards at the UGA MUN competition.

At the 2013 KSUMUN Conference, GSMST students won the Best Outstanding Delegate Award representing Qatar in the Economics and Social Council committee and a Best Position Paper award representing Qatar in the World Health Organization committee.

The GSMST Model United Nations team relies on their official website to display announcements and achievements. The team also uses the website to educate fellow delegates and peers about international relations and foreign policy.

Robotics Club 

VEX

FTC

FRC (Disbanded)

ROV (Disbanded)

Science Olympiad 
GSMST has finished in first place at their regional tournament every year since 2011, and finished second at the State Tournament (thus qualifying for the National Tournament) every year from 2011 through 2014.

Honor Societies 
 
 Engineering Honor Society 
 Mu Alpha Theta
 National Art Honor Society
 National German Honor Society 
 National Honor Society
 National Spanish Honor Society 
 Rho Kappa National Social Studies Honor Society 
 Tri-M Music Honor Society
Updated August 27th, 2021

Press 

The school was featured in the Atlanta Journal Constitution on October 2, 2007.
Six years after their debut in the AJC, the Gwinnett School of Mathematics, Science, and Technology students and administration brought the school to a remarkable position as one of the top three best high schools in the United States, reported by US News,
along with the School for the Talented and Gifted in Dallas, Texas, and BASIS Tucson in Tucson, Arizona. Aside from an outstanding national ranking, GSMST is also recognized as the top high school in Georgia. The US News article was also referenced in an article on the Huffington Post webpage.

In U.S. News & World Reports 2014 Best High Schools in the US, GSMST maintained its 3rd-place position for the second consecutive year.
The school also rose from its #198 position in the top STEM schools of America to #20. The school is still recognized as the top high school in Georgia, with a college-readiness index of 100, as reported by US News. Shortly before US News annual high school ranking publication, the Washington Post listed GSMST as the 17th most challenging high school in the US.

U.S. News & World Report ranked GSMST as the fourth best public high school in the United States in 2015.

U.S. News & World Report ranked GSMST as the thirty-fifth best public high school in the United States in 2017.

U.S. News & World Report ranked GSMST as the thirty-third best public high school in the United States in 2018.

U.S. News & World Report ranked GSMST as the sixth best public high school in the United States in 2019.

In 2016, GSMST was also rewarded with a Blue Ribbon Award.

References

Educational institutions established in 2007
Public high schools in Georgia (U.S. state)
Schools in Gwinnett County, Georgia
Charter schools in Georgia (U.S. state)
2007 establishments in Georgia (U.S. state)